NOG or Nog may refer to:
 Antônio Rodrigo Nogueira, Mixed martial arts fighter, also known as "Big Nog"
 Antônio Rogério Nogueira, Mixed martial arts  fighter, also known as "Little Nog"
 Nog (Star Trek), fictional character, a young Ferengi in Star Trek: Deep Space Nine
 Noggin (protein), also known as NOG, a human protein
 N-Oxalylglycine, an organic compound
 Internet network operators' groups (NOGs), informal groups which provide forums for Internet network operators
 NOG, IATA code for Nogales International Airport (Mexico), Nogales, Sonora
 NOG, FAA location identifier for Naval Auxiliary Landing Field Orange Grove, a military airport southwest of Orange Grove, Texas
 nog, slang for eggnog
 Nogs, a people in Noggin the Nog, a popular British children's television series
 Nog (novel), by Rudolph Wurlitzer
 Brick nog, bricks filled in-between wooden framing
 A horizontal framing member in a wall or floor also called a nogging piece or dwang
 Nogai (ISO 639-2 nog), a Turkic language of the North Caucasus

See also
 NOG mouse, a variety of mice used in medical research
 Antônio Rodrigo Nogueira, a Brazilian mixed martial artist also known as "Big Nog"